The St. Peters Harbour Light  is a lighthouse on St. Peter's Bay, Prince Edward Island, Canada. The station was established in 1865 and the lighthouse itself was built in 1881. It has been inactive since spring 2008.

Keepers
 Martin McInnis       1868 – 1869
 William McGrath    1874 – 1900
 Albert Anderson    1900 – 1912
 James McGrath      1912 – ?

See also
 List of lighthouses in Prince Edward Island
 List of lighthouses in Canada

References

External links
Picture of St. Peters Harbour Light Lighthouse Friends
 Aids to Navigation Canadian Coast Guard

Lighthouses completed in 1881
Lighthouses in Prince Edward Island
1881 establishments in Canada
Buildings and structures in Kings County, Prince Edward Island